Uncial 0260 (in the Gregory-Aland numbering), is a Greek-Coptic uncial manuscript of the New Testament. Palaeographically it has been assigned to the 6th century. The manuscript has survived in a very fragmentary condition.

Description 

The codex contains some parts of the Gospel of John 1:30-32, on 2 parchment leaves. The text is written in two columns per page, 16 lines per page, in uncial letters. Coptic text is in Fayyumic dialect.

Currently it is dated by the INTF to the 6th century.

Location 
Currently the codex is housed at the Berlin State Museums (P. 5542) in Berlin.

Text 

The text-type of this codex is mixed. Aland placed it in Category III. The manuscript was examined by Kurt Treu and Horseley. Iw was used in 26. edition of Novum Testamentum Graece of Nestle-Aland.

See also 

 List of New Testament uncials
 Coptic versions of the Bible
 Textual criticism

References

Further reading 

  
 Kurt Treu, "Griechisch-koptische Bilinguen des Neuen Testaments", Wissenschaftliche Zeitschrift der Martin-Luther-Universität (Halle/Wittenberg, 1965), pp. 95-123. 
 G. H. R. Horseley, "New Documents Illustrating Early Christianity" 2 (Macquarie University, 1982), pp. 125-140. 
 U. B. Schmid, D. C. Parker, W. J. Elliott, The Gospel according to St. John: The majuscules (Brill 2007), p. 145. [text of the codex]

Greek New Testament uncials
6th-century biblical manuscripts
Greek-Coptic diglot manuscripts of the New Testament